Ramakrishnan Murthy is a Carnatic Music vocalist from India. He regularly performs in the annual Madras Music Season besides being featured in music festivals world over that focus on Indian Classical music. He is an A-grade artist of the All India Radio and Doordarshan, Chennai.

Early life and tutelage 

Ramakrishnan Murthy began his Carnatic music training from Smt. Padma Kutty in Irvine in 1997. In 2001, he began to take advanced lessons from veteran violin artist Delhi P. Sunder Rajan. Ramakrishnan also spent brief periods of time learning from Vairamangalam Lakshmi Narayanan, CR Vaidyanathan, Vaikom Jayachandran and Chengleput Ranganathan. He is currently under the tutelage of R. K. Shriramkumar.

Education 

Ramakrishnan Murthy is an Informatics graduate from the University of California, Irvine.

Concert career 

In June 2011, after completing his undergraduate education, Ramakrishnan moved to Chennai permanently and began pursuing Carnatic music full time. He has, since, performed regularly in Indian and international music festivals and famous sabhas, including the Madras Music Academy and has been accompanied by virtually all the notable names in the field of music today.

Ramakrishnan has also done playback singing for films, debuting with the song "Nalla Nanban" under composer Harris Jayaraj for Shankar's 2012 film Nanban.

Style and influences 

His wise sense of aesthetics, his alignment to pitch(shruthi shuddham), enunciation of words, the clarity of his gamakas and his patanthara are often appreciated by critics.

Some critics have noted a coarseness in his voice, but this texture of his voice is also seen to lend a husky texture to certain ragas like Sahana.

The influence of Ramnad Krishnan, Semmangudi Srinivasa Iyer, and K. V. Narayanaswamy has been observed in his music.

Awards and titles 

 Yagnaraman Award of Excellence, Shri Krishna Gana Sabha, 2016
 Kalki Krishnamurthy Memorial Award, Kalki Krishnamurthy Trust, Chennai, 2014
 Shanmukha Sangeetha Shironmani title from Shanmukhananda Fine Arts and Sangeetha Sabha, Mumbai, 2013.
 Outstanding Vocalist for four consecutive years from the Madras Music Academy, 2011-2014
 Best Senior Vocalist, Madras Music Academy, 2016
 Asthana Vidvan, Sringeri Sharada Peetham, 2017
 Senior Outstanding Concert Award, Madras Music Academy, 2017
 Senior Outstanding Vocalist, Madras Music Academy, 2019
 Isai Peroli title from Kartik Fine Arts, Chennai

References 

Living people
1989 births
Male Carnatic singers
Carnatic singers